is a 1992 Japanese film directed by Katsuya Matsumura. It is the first in a series of six films. Matsumura won an award for best new director at the Yokohama Film Festival for this film.

Plot 
Three teenagers witness the brutal murder of a high school girl by an insane salaryman. The teenagers find themselves united by this event and become friends. Later the teenagers hold a party to take their mind off things. Their party is crashed by a local gang of thugs and one teenager finds his newly found girlfriend being raped. The teenagers deal with the thugs by using extreme violence.

Cast 
 Eisuke Tsunoda as Suzuki Kensuke
 Ryōsuke Suzuki as Saitô Shinji
 Yōji Ietomi as Tanaka Tetsuya
 Hiromasa Taguchi as Tamari
 Third Nagashima as Phantom Killer
 Sachiko Wakayama as Yoshiko
 Yumi Goto as Eri
 Ayumi Nagashii as Girl at the train crossing
 Yumi Kayama as Yôko
 Kenichi Mōri as Delinquent Leader
 Keiichi Mano
 Tomoyuki Shimada
 Makoto Ogawa
 Tomorowo Taguchi as Airline Manager
 Rusher Kimura as Industrial High School Teacher

Release 
The film has been released on DVD in the Netherlands on the Japan Shock label. It has been released on DVD in the US by Tokyo Shock and in Japan on both VHS and DVD by Kadokawa Pictures (as Daiei Motion Picture Company). Prior to it receiving a DVD release with English subtitles it was heavily distributed on the Video Tape exchange circuit.

See also
All Night Long 2 (1995)
All Night Long 3 (1996)

External links

Further reading

Reviews 
 All Night Long review at Midnight Eye
 All Night Long review at Slasherama

References

1992 films
1992 horror films
1990s exploitation films
Films directed by Katsuya Matsumura
1990s Japanese-language films
1990s horror thriller films
Japanese horror thriller films
1990s Japanese films